USNS Bowditch has been the name of more than one United States Navy ship, and may refer to:

, an oceanographic survey ship in non-commissioned Military Sealift Command service from 1958 to ca. 1988
, an oceanographic survey ship in non-commissioned Military Sealift Command service since 1996

See also

United States Navy ship names